Grauże Nowe  is a village in the administrative district of Gmina Szypliszki, within Suwałki County, Podlaskie Voivodeship, in north-eastern Poland, close to the border with Lithuania. From 1975 to 1998, it was in Suwałki Voivodeship. The towns nearest to it are Grauże Stare, Lipowo, Klonorejść, and Kaletnik. Its name probably comes from the Lithuanian word gražus, meaning 'beautiful'; 'nowe' means 'new' in Polish. The village is considered beautiful because of a scenic lake, Grauże; about 10 meters away from the lake is a resort.

Notable people
Notable people born in, living in, or otherwise associated with Grauże Nowe include:

References

Nowe Grauze